Lucky One Mall is a shopping mall located in Karachi, Sindh, Pakistan, which is owned by Yunus Brothers Group. It is the largest shopping mall in Pakistan, with an area of about 3.4 million square feet. It is also the second largest mall in South Asia, and the 31st largest mall in the world. It is home to over 200 stores and different services with a large indoor parking space for 1200 cars.

It also includes an atrium, brand outlets, food court, and areas for musical concerts and fashion shows. LuckyOne mall is also the only mall in Pakistan that has an in mall open air food street. The mall has a combination of national and international clothing brands, and a selection of international fast food restaurants.

The mall also featured the indoor theme park Onederland, which consists of over 200 attractions across 2 levels.

The mall recorded over 100,000 visitors on its opening day. It has conducted different launches for the biggest fashion brands in Pakistan and aims to revolutionize the shopping experience in Pakistan.
The outdoor food street has many fine dining restaurants. 

It also includes Carrefour, a large renowned hyper market offering a large variety of different grocery, household & electronic items. There are many other famous brands like Hush Puppies, Travel Mate, Services Shoes, Pakistan's Largest Home & office furniture store Interwood Mobel, Pakistan's oldest shoes brand Bata Corporation, Gree Electric & many more.

Residential Towers

Lucky One is a residential project under construction in Karachi, Pakistan, comprising eight buildings, each having 28 floors and a mall at podium level. This will be Carrefour's second hypermarket in Karachi as one is located in Dolmen Mall Clifton. The mall is to be built on 3.2 million square feet,– several times the size of Dolmen Mall. the project also includes an eight-screen multiplex, a fun planet, a bowling alley, a food court as well as dining restaurants, a ramp for holding fashion shows, a space for music concerts as well as parking space for 3,000 cars and a captive power plant. The project will generate employment for 10,000 to 15,000 people.

See also 
 List of largest shopping malls in the world
 List of shopping malls in Pakistan
 Emporium Mall
 List of tallest buildings in Pakistan
 List of tallest buildings in Karachi
 List of tallest buildings in the world
 List of tallest buildings in Islamabad
 List of tallest buildings in Lahore

References

Yunus Brothers Group
Buildings and structures in Karachi
Shopping malls in Pakistan
Shopping malls established in 2017